The CITS Group Corporation is a state-owned leisure and tourism corporation based in Beijing, China.
It is primarily engaged in travel services, duty-free trade and real estate development and management.
Among its major subsidiaries include CITS Head Office, China Duty Free Group, CITS Real Estates, etc.
The group is also the holding company of CITS Corporation Ltd, a domestically listed joint-stock corporation.

References 

Tourism in China
Chinese companies established in 1954
2016 mergers and acquisitions